CallMiner is a Massachusetts-based software company that develops speech analytics and interaction analytics software. It was founded in 2002 and is headquartered in Waltham, MA with offices in Fort Myers, FL, Boston, MA, and the United Kingdom. The company uses Artificial Intelligence to extract insight from the conversations that occur between businesses and their customers, typically through the contact center. These conversations can be voice-based and occur over the phone, or text-based and occur over digital mediums such as online, chat, email, social media messaging, and more. As of December 2019, CallMiner has raised six rounds of venture funding. Its largest and latest investment was 2019’s funding from GS Growth, an investment unit of Goldman Sachs.

History 
CallMiner was founded in 2002 by Jeff Gallino, Cliff LaCoursiere and Kim Brown. The company develops technology for Customer service and call centers with a focus on improving contact center performance and gathering key business intelligence through analysis of contacts across companies’ communication channels. As of September 2017, CallMiner has raised 5 rounds of funding from 7 investors, beginning with a $2 million Series A round in August 2004, with Inflexion Partners leading the round. Most recently, the company raised $6 million in venture capital in January 2016. In addition to Inflexion Capital, other investors include Florida Growth Fund, In-Q-Tel, Intersouth Partners, NewSpring Capital, Sigma Partners and Village Ventures.

On 10 August 2020, CallMiner announced a partnership with Intradiem. The new alliance helps contact centers to increase the bar for customer loyalty and employee quality control by activating smart behavior from voice and text communications automatically.

Products
CallMiner’s product offering consists of CallMiner Eureka, the company’s core analytics platform providing speech and text analytics for customer interactions, as well as several applications that work on top of the core platform including the following: 
 Analyze - Analyst workbench for searching, categorizing, and scoring conversations across all customer communication channels.
 Visualize - Graphical data exploration, discovery, and presentation powered by Tableau. Offered as an integrated add-on to Analyze.
 Coach - An automated agent performance management and feedback solution, providing performance scoring results directly to supervisors and agents, and enabling coaching workflow.
 Alert - A call center automated monitoring solution that monitors in-progress calls to detect specific language and acoustic characteristics, and then provides prompts to agents[11] and supervisors while the call is still ongoing. Alert also offers analytics via a real-time API for integrating data and alerts into third party applications.
 Redact - A stand-alone product for removing sensitive payment and card holder data from call recordings, either in batch or real-time.
 Capture - Acquires contact center audio in real-time specifically for speech analytics.
 API – Provides programmatic access to applications for submitting data for analysis, extracting data, and conducting queries or system.

Awards
  CallMiner named a Leader in The Forrester New Wave™: AI-Fueled Speech Analytics Solutions, Q2 2018 - 2018
 Top 10 Contact Centre Technologies of 2017 – 2017
 2016 PACE Technovation Award - 2016
 2009 Product of the Year Award from Technology Marketing Corporation’s Customer Interaction Solutions magazine – 2009
 Customer Interaction Solutions 2007 Speech Technology Excellence Award - 2007

References 

2002 establishments in Massachusetts
Software companies established in 2002
Software companies based in Massachusetts
Companies based in Waltham, Massachusetts
Speech recognition software
Software companies of the United States